Shahzad Ali Malik is a former President of Lahore Chamber of Commerce and Industry. In 2013, he received the prestigious Sitara-i-Imtiaz (Star of Excellence) Award by the President of Pakistan, the third-highest decoration given to any civilian in Pakistan, in recognition of his research work in the field of hybrid rice technology for higher and better rice yields in Pakistan.

Rice Exporters Association of Pakistan
He had served as chairman of Rice Exporters Association of Pakistan, during 1999-2001 period.

References

Pakistani businesspeople
Businesspeople from Lahore
Recipients of Sitara-i-Imtiaz
Agriculture in Pakistan